The 2015 United States state legislative elections were held on November 3, 2015. Seven legislative chambers in four states held regularly-scheduled elections. These off-year elections coincided with other state and local elections, including gubernatorial elections in three states.

Republicans maintained control of both chambers of the Louisiana, Mississippi, and Virginia legislatures, while Democrats maintained control of the New Jersey General assembly.

Summary table 
Regularly-scheduled elections were held in 7 of the 99 state legislative chambers in the United States. Nationwide, regularly-scheduled elections were held for 538 of the 7,383 legislative seats. This table only covers regularly-scheduled elections; additional special elections took place concurrently with these regularly-scheduled elections.

State summaries

Louisiana 

All seats of the Louisiana State Senate and the Louisiana House of Representatives were up for election to four-year terms in single-member districts. Republicans retained majority control in both chambers.

Mississippi 
All seats of the Mississippi State Senate and the Mississippi House of Representatives were up for election to four-year terms in single-member districts. Republicans retained majority control in both chambers.

New Jersey 

All seats of the New Jersey General Assembly were up for election to two-year terms in coterminous two-member districts. The New Jersey Senate did not hold regularly-scheduled elections. Democrats maintained majority control in the lower house.

Virginia 

All seats of the Senate of Virginia and the Virginia House of Delegates were up for election in single-member districts. Senators were elected to four-year terms, while delegates serve terms of two years. Republicans maintained control of both legislative chambers.

See also 
 2015 United States gubernatorial elections

Notes

References 

 
State legislative elections
State legislature elections in the United States by year